Heath Kizzier (born August 3, 1967) is an American actor. He is best known for his role as Dr. Joshua Landers in the CBS soap opera The Young and the Restless.

Selected filmography

References

External links

1967 births
Living people
American male film actors
American male soap opera actors